The  flpD RNA motif is a conserved RNA structure discovered using bioinformatics.  It is detected only in methanogenic archaea, and is generally located in the apparent 5' untranslated region of genes encoding hydrogenases that are likely involved in methane metabolism.  For example, the flpD gene itself encodes a subunit of methyl-viologen-reducing hydrogenase.

References

External links
 

Cis-regulatory RNA elements